The False Friend is a 1917 American silent drama film directed by Harry Davenport and starring Robert Warwick, Gail Kane and Jack Drumier.

Cast
 Robert Warwick as William Ramsdell 
 Gail Kane as Virginia Farrell 
 Jack Drumier as Robert Farrell 
 Earl Schenck as De Witt Clinton 
 P.J. Rollow as J. Carleton Clinton 
 Lewis Edgard as Byron 
 Pinna Nesbit as Marietta

References

Bibliography
 James Robert Parish. Hollywood character actors. Arlington House, 1978.

External links
 

1917 films
1917 drama films
1910s English-language films
American silent feature films
Silent American drama films
Films directed by Harry Davenport
American black-and-white films
World Film Company films
1910s American films